Zhang Weiwei is the name of:

Zhang Weiwei (professor) (born 1957), Chinese political scientist and writer
Zhang Weiwei (water polo) (born 1990), Chinese water polo player

See also
Vivibear (born 1977), Chinese fiction writer, real name Zhang Weiwei